The Love Trap or The Love Cage (German:Der Liebeskäfig) is a 1925 German silent film directed by Erich Schönfelder and Richard Eichberg and starring Hans Wassmann, Maria Reisenhofer and Herbert Paulmüller.

The film's sets were designed by the art director Kurt Richter.

Cast
 Hans Wassmann as Gottlob Degen  
 Maria Reisenhofer as Emma Degen, seine Frau  
 Herbert Paulmüller as August Waltjen  
 Johannes Riemann as Gert Waltjen, sein Sohn  
 Carl Auen as Michael Cornelius  
 Elena Lunda as Susi Verden  
 E. Herrmann as Hermann Schröder  
 Fritz Carl Perponcher as Eleganter junger Mann  
 Maria Forescu as Dettas Zofe  
 Herr Rieser as Eleganter junger Mann  
 Carl Jönsson as Theaterdirektor 
 Bruno Kastner 
 Frieda Lehndorf 
 Lee Parry

References

External links

1925 films
Films of the Weimar Republic
Films directed by Erich Schönfelder
Films directed by Richard Eichberg
German silent feature films
German black-and-white films